They Call Me Cadillac is the second studio album by American country music singer Randy Houser. It was released September 21, 2010, by Show Dog-Universal Music. It includes the singles "Whistlin' Dixie", "I'm All About It", and "A Man Like Me," the former of which peaked at No. 31 on the Hot Country Songs chart in late 2009.

Critical reception

Stephen Thomas Erlewine of AllMusic says that the songs are "sturdy, straight ahead tunes" and considers the material better-written than that of Anything Goes.

Track listing

Personnel
Credits provided by AllMusic

Cliff Audretch III - percussion
Nick Buda - drums
Fred Eltringham - drums
Keith Gattis - acoustic guitar, baritone guitar, electric guitar, percussion
Kenny Greenberg - electric guitar
Jimmy Hall - harmonica
Wes Hightower - background vocals
Randy Houser - acoustic guitar, lead vocals
Trey Landry - drums
"Cowboy" Eddie Long - pedal bass, pedal steel guitar
Phil Madeira - keyboards
Rob McNelley - electric guitar
Michael Rhodes - bass guitar
John Henry Trinko - keyboards
Lee Ann Womack - background vocals
Glenn Worf - bass guitar

Charts

References

2010 albums
Randy Houser albums
Show Dog-Universal Music albums
Albums produced by Mark Wright (record producer)